Tangent arcs are a type of halo, an atmospheric optical phenomenon, which appears above and below the observed Sun or Moon, tangent to the 22° halo. To produce these arcs, rod-shaped hexagonal ice crystals need to have their long axis aligned horizontally.

Description

Upper arc 
The shape of an upper tangent arc varies with the elevation of the Sun; while the Sun is low (less than 29–32°) it appears as an arc over the observed Sun forming a sharp angle.  As the Sun is seen to rise above the Earth's horizon, the curved wings of the arc lower towards the 22° halo while gradually becoming longer.  As the Sun rises over 29–32°, the upper tangent arc unites with the lower tangent arc to form the circumscribed halo.

Lower arc 
The lower tangent arc is rarely observable, appearing under and tangent to a 22° halo centred on the Sun. Just like upper tangent arcs, the shape of a lower arc is dependent on the altitude of the Sun.  As the Sun is observed slipping over Earth's horizon the lower tangent arc forms a sharp, wing-shaped angle below the Sun.  As the Sun rises over Earth's horizon, the arc first folds upon itself and then takes the shape of a wide arc.  As the Sun reaches 29-32° over the horizon, it finally begins to widen and merge with the upper tangent arc to form the circumscribed halo.

Since by definition, the Sun elevation must exceed 22° above the horizon, most observations are from elevated observation points such as mountains and planes.

Origin 

Both the upper and lower tangent arc form when hexagonal rod-shaped ice crystals in cirrus clouds have their long axis oriented horizontally.  Each crystal can have its long axis oriented in a different horizontal direction, and can rotate around the long axis.  Such a crystal configuration also produces other halos, including 22° halos and sun dogs; a predominant horizontal orientation is required to produce a crisp upper tangent arc.  Like all colored halos, tangent arcs grade from red towards the Sun (i.e., downwards) to blue away from it, because red light is refracted less strongly than blue light.

See also 

 Circumhorizontal arc
 Circumzenithal arc
 Kern arc
 Subsun

References

External links 
 www.paraselene.de - Tangent Arcs (including several HaloSim simulations.)
 Atmospheric Optics - Alaska Lower Tangent Arc - Great photo by Ryan Skorecki.
 Atmospheric Optics - Lower Tangent arc - A photo taken from an aeroplane.
 Lower Tangent Arc Sep 25, 2005 - Photos of a lower tangent arc.

Atmospheric optical phenomena

ja:外接ハロ#上端接弧と下端接弧